Tuckernuck Island Airport  is a small, unpaved airstrip located on Tuckernuck Island in the town of Nantucket. It is privately owned and currently has one aircraft, a Cessna 185, based there. It has one runway. The south end of the runway meets the water of the north Atlantic Ocean, while the north end meets the islands forests and grasslands. There is one shed on the east side. The runway length is decreasing due to sea level rise and beach erosion, attributable to climate change.

External links

Airports in Nantucket, Massachusetts
Privately owned airports